The Brave and the Bold is a comic book series published by DC Comics from 1955 to 1983.

The Brave and the Bold may also refer to:

 The Brave and the Bold (film), an upcoming film
 "The Brave and the Bold" (Arrow), an episode of Arrow
 The Brave and the Bold (album), a studio album
 Batman: The Brave and the Bold, an animated television series
 List of Batman: The Brave and the Bold episodes
 List of Batman: The Brave and the Bold characters
 Batman: The Brave and the Bold (comics), a comic book series
 Batman: The Brave and the Bold – The Videogame, a video game
 Scooby-Doo! & Batman: The Brave and the Bold, an animated film